Abesim is a town in Sunyani Municipal District in the Bono Region of Ghana. Abesim is very close to the regional capital town of the Bono Region, Sunyani. Abesim is known for the St. James Seminary and Secondary School. It is also known for the Olistar Senior High School and Abesim Senior High School. The school is a second cycle institution.

References

Populated places in the Bono Region